Samantha Ronson (born 7 August 1977) is an English DJ, singer, and songwriter who lives in Santa Monica, California, United States.

Early life
Ronson was born in Camden, London, to writer/socialite Ann Dexter-Jones and one-time music executive and real estate entrepreneur Laurence Ronson.

When she was six years old her parents divorced and she moved with her siblings, mother and her mother's new boyfriend, Foreigner guitarist Mick Jones, to New York City, where her mother later married Jones.

Her parents are of Ashkenazi Jewish descent, with ancestors from Austria, Russia, and Lithuania, and Ronson was brought up in Conservative Judaism. Ronson's family name was originally Aaronson, but her grandfather Henry Ronson changed it to Ronson.

She is the niece of property tycoon Gerald Ronson. Ronson is related to British Conservative politicians Sir Malcolm Rifkind and Leon Brittan, as well as Odeon Cinemas founder Oscar Deutsch. Ronson's older brother, Mark, is a music producer and musician; her fraternal twin sister, Charlotte, is a fashion designer. Ronson has five younger half-siblings; Kenneth and Annabelle, through her mother's remarriage to Mick Jones; as well as Henrietta, David, and Joshua (by her father's marriage to model Michele First). Ronson has two step-brothers, Roman and Chris Jones, by Mick Jones' previous marriage. Ronson's stepfather Mick Jones contributed to a childhood surrounded by music.

Ronson was educated at the Chapin School on Manhattan's Upper East Side. She then studied creative writing and philosophy at New York University.

Career

Early DJ years (2002–2010)
Ronson has stated that she fell into DJing by chance. "I got a call one night from a club that I used to hang out at and they were like, 'Do you want to DJ?'" Ronson remembered. "I was like, 'No way,' [but] my friends were like, 'Come on, just do it.' I was always in the club; [I figured I] might as well make money off it." Ronson took the gig and she quickly started to make a name for herself and eventually DJing became a full-time job. Today she spins at some of the most high-profile gigs around the world. She has spun live for MTV's New Year's Eve show from the network's studios in Times Square, as well as at the Super Bowl, Pan American Games, Sundance Film Festival, amfAR, Cannes Film Festival, AMA and VMA. She has played private events for celebrities like Stevie Wonder, Jimmy Kimmel, Nicole Richie, Lionel Richie, Jessica Simpson, Ellen DeGeneres, Natalie Portman, Lindsay Lohan, and Jay-Z.

Ronson was the official DJ for Hennessy (Hennessy Black) in 2011. 
In 2009,2010 and 2014 Ronson designed her own set of sneakers for the company Supra. She appeared in a 2011 campaign for cult fashion label Boy London in collaboration with The Cobra Snake (Mark Hunter). She is or was a co-owner of the New York City nightclub The Plumm, along with actor Chris Noth and Noel Ashman, among others.

Ronson became the first rock act signed to Roc-A-Fella Records. In 2002, it was announced Duncan Sheik would be co-producing an album for Ronson that would be out in the spring. She released four songs on Roc-A-Fella Records: "Pull My Hair Out", "Fool", "If It's Gonna Rain" and "Built This Way", and wrote and recorded her first album, Red. "Built This Way" was featured in the movie Mean Girls starring Lindsay Lohan and Rachel McAdams. "Pull My Hair Out" was featured on the soundtrack of the movie The Woodsman starring Kevin Bacon and the song "Wanted", by Rhymefest featuring Samantha Ronson, appeared in the movie Half Nelson. In 2004, she opened for JC Chasez on his Schizophrenic tour. However, inauspicious timing and the dissolution of the Roc-A-Fella Records led to her first album never being released.

Chasing the Reds (2011)
In November 2011, Ronson released the album Chasing the Reds on her own label, Broken Toy Records. The album showcased her songwriting abilities, drawing inspiration from events in her life. In an interview with American Songwriter, she stated, "I grew up in the studio with songs. My stepdad wrote some pretty f—ing incredible songs. My brother [producer and musician Mark Ronson] made his records because he likes making songs. So, the standard was set pretty high for being true to what you want to do. I'm not just going to hand my song over to a producer; I want to be there every step of the way...I feel like when you're doing what you love, instead of fitting yourself into somebody else's box, that comes across".

Guest stars appear on the album including Wale on "Summer of Sam", Alex Greenwald of Phantom Planet on "Captain Jack" and Slash on the track "Love Song". The album was produced by former Goudie guitarist Jimmy Messer, with Ronson herself sharing co producing credits. Her brother Mark produced one track, "Skyscrapers", which was co-written by the siblings with Santigold.

Ocean Park Standoff (2016–present)
In 2016, Ronson, Pete Nappi and Ethan Thompson formed the band Ocean Park Standoff. The members first met at a songwriting session in 2014. Their debut single "Good News" was released on 7 October 2016, along with its B-side, "Photos & Liquor". Ocean Park Standoff is going on a US tour starting in February 2017, and their debut EP was released on Hollywood Records on 3 March 2017.

Legal actions
In May 2007, American actress Lindsay Lohan crashed her Mercedes-Benz in Beverly Hills. Police found a "small amount" of cocaine in her car and blogger Perez Hilton posted on his blog that the drugs belonged to Ronson, using another celebrity gossip blog as a source for the story. Two weeks later he started selling "Blame Samantha" T-shirts and called Ronson a "lezbot dj". Ronson hired Martin Garbus to start a defamation suit against Hilton and the original source for the story, Celebrity Babylon. Celebrity Babylon agreed to issue a retraction and apology on the understanding that Ronson would drop the claim; Hilton's lawyers asked the judge to throw out the case as an assault on his free speech rights. Garbus thought that it would be impossible to produce evidence that Hilton had acted with malice and reached an agreement with Hilton which would have kept Ronson from paying his legal fees. Ronson wanted Hilton's retraction and vetoed the proposal. Around the same time Garbus presented a $100,000 bill after the $25,000 retainer had been accounted for. Garbus withdrew from the case and neither he nor Ronson appeared at Hilton's hearing, where the judge ruled in Hilton's favour dismissing the case and ordering Ronson to pay Hilton's $85,000 legal fees.

Two weeks later Garbus sued Ronson in New York for close to $142,000 in fees and services. He later dropped that suit. In May, Ronson filed suit against Garbus in Los Angeles County Superior Court, contending that his incompetence had lost the case against Hilton and asking for damages in excess of $300,000. Among the allegations was that Garbus failed to fulfill his duties as her attorney because he was focused on collecting his fees. In response to Ronson's malpractice suit he countersued to recover his fees.

On 1 August 2011, Ronson was pulled over in Baker, California, while driving her Porsche Targa back home from Las Vegas. She was initially stopped for driving 89 m.p.h. in a 70 m.p.h. speed zone, but was given a balance test, since she seemed impaired. She was arrested for two misdemeanors for driving under the influence.

Personal life
About her sexuality, Ronson had initially denied claims that she is a lesbian, stating that she dates both women and men:

In 2007, media outlets began commenting on Ronson and actress Lindsay Lohan, who were seen being affectionate in public. Several newspapers, including The Times and the Los Angeles Times, published opinion pieces describing their relationship as romantic. Lohan refrained from commenting on the nature of their relationship, stating through her publicist that she "wants to keep her private life private." Ronson stated in a July 2010 interview with The Times that she loves Lohan as a human being but the paparazzi attention grew to be too much.

In June 2011, when Ronson was pictured with music producer David Foster's daughter—actress and writer Erin Foster—several media outlets reported that Ronson and Foster were a couple. Ronson has never commented on the relationship other than to state she is not single.

In September 2012, Ronson started dating Jessica Alba’s makeup artist Lauren Andersen. The two had an off and on relationship until 2015. Ronson started dating aspiring poet Cleo Wade after her breakup with Andersen. In late 2017, Ronson started dating Cassandra Grey. Ronson moved in with Cassandra grey and her two year old son Jules in 2018. Ronson got engaged to Cassandra Grey in 2022.

In February 2022, Ronson appeared on the Queery podcast, where she stated that she had struggled with accepting her sexuality for years. She also stated that she now identifies as gay.

Cameos

Ronson appears in the music videos for Usher and Alicia Keys' "My Boo", Awolnation's "Burn It Down", N.E.R.D's "Everyone Nose", and brother Mark Ronson's "Ooh Wee". Ronson also appeared in a Gap commercial featuring rapper Common.

Discography

Albums
 Red, Roc-A-Fella Records (2004, unreleased)
 Chasing the Reds – Samantha Ronson & The Undertakers, Broken Toy Records (2011)

Mixtapes
 Samantha Ronson & DJ AM – Challah (2003)
 Mark Ronson & Samantha Ronson – Get High (2004)
 Mark Ronson & Samantha Ronson – Get S R – The C Ronson Mixtape (2004)
 Samantha Ronson – Chasing the Red Mix CD (2011)

Singles
"Fool" (2000)
"Pull My Hair Out" (2004)
"Built This Way" (2004)
"Good News" (with Ocean Park Standoff, 2016)

Remixes
 Awolnation feat Wale – "Guilty Filthy Soul (Samantha Ronson Remix)" (2012)
 Duncan Sheik – "Kyoto Song (Samantha Ronson Remix)" (2012)
 The Chainsmokers feat Priyanka Chopra – "Erase (Samantha Ronson Remix)" (2013)
 Natalia Kills – "Saturday Night (Samantha Ronson vs. DK Remix)" (2013)
 Lady Gaga feat R. Kelly – "Do What U Want (Samantha Ronson Remix)" (2014)

References

External links

 Ocean Park Standoff website

Samantha Ronson on Instagram

1977 births
British DJs
Chapin School (Manhattan) alumni
English emigrants to the United States
English women songwriters
English expatriates in the United States
British Ashkenazi Jews
English Jews
English people of Austrian-Jewish descent
English people of Lithuanian-Jewish descent
English people of Russian-Jewish descent
English socialites
British hip hop DJs
Jewish English musicians
Lesbian Jews
English lesbian musicians
English LGBT singers
English LGBT songwriters
Living people
Nightclub owners
Lesbian singers
Lesbian songwriters
People from St John's Wood
S
English twins
English women in electronic music
Samantha Ronson
People with acquired American citizenship
21st-century English women singers